Animal Genetics is a bi-monthly scientific journal published by the Wiley-Blackwell on behalf of the International Society for Animal Genetics.

The impact factor of Animal Genetics is  2.605 (2009) making the journal number 9, out of 50, in the Thomson Reuters ISI "Agriculture, Dairy & Animal Science" category.

Animal Genetics publishes research on immunogenetics, molecular genetics and functional genomics of economically important and domesticated animals.  Publications include the study of variability at gene and protein levels, mapping of gene, traits and QTLs, associations between genes and traits, genetic diversity, and characterization of gene expression and control.

External links 
 International Society for Animal Genetics
 Journal Homepage
 Online Content
 genetics

Notes

All organisms in the Kingdom Animalia are multicellular heterotroph's that are also eukaryotes.

Genetics journals
Wiley-Blackwell academic journals
English-language journals
Publications established in 1987